This is a list of islands of El Salvador:

Islands 
Under Salvadoran control:
Isla Montecristo
Isla Martin Perez
Meanguera del Golfo
Isla Conchaguita
Isla Perico
Isla San Juan del Gozo
Isla Espiritu Santo (El Salvador)
Isla Meanguerita
Isla Zacatillo
Isla Chuchito
Isla Ilca
Isla Periquito
Isla Coyote
Isla La Cribá

Furthermore:
Isla Conejo, in the Gulf of Fonseca; disputed with Honduras

See also

 Geography of El Salvador

References 

Armed Forces of El Salvador Libro Blanco, Capitulo 1 (en Español)

 
Islands
El Salvador